Fulgence is a Francophone given name, and refers to several saints named Fulgence: Saint Fulgence de Ruspe (533), Saint Fulgence (633), Saint Fulgence (Ethiopian Bishop, 4th century). 

Some modern  bearers of that name:
 Fulgence Bienvenüe (1852–1936), French civil engineer, famous for his participation in the creation of the Paris Métro
 Fulgence Charpentier (1897–2001), French-Canadian journalist, editor and publisher
 Fulgence Ouedraogo (born 1982), French rugby union footballer
 Fulgence Rabemahafaly (born 1951), Archbishop of Fianarantsoa, Madagascar
 Fulgence Raymond (1844-1910), French neurologist

References

See also
Wiktionary:fulgent

Fulgence